Salvioni is an Italian-language surname. Notable people with the surname include:

Carlo Salvioni (1858–1920), Swiss-Italian professor of Romance languages and linguistics
Emilia Salvioni (1895–1968), Italian writer
Sandro Salvioni (born 1953), Italian football manager and former player

Italian-language surnames